Schweinfurt Mitte (German for Schweinfurt Central) is a railway station in the Lower Franconian city of Schweinfurt, Germany. It is located close to the city centre, and is served by regional trains.

References

External links
Schweinfurt-Mitte, DB.
Stationssteckbrief Schweinfurt Mitte at Stationsdatenbank Bayern

Railway stations in Bavaria
Mitte station